Thomasville Downtown Historic District is a national historic district located at Thomasville, Davidson County, North Carolina. The district encompasses 46 contributing buildings, 1 contributing site, 2 contributing structures, and 2 contributing objects in the central business district of Thomasville.  It includes commercial and governmental buildings built between 1871 and 1938. Located in the district is the separately listed Thomasville Railroad Passenger Depot. Other notable contributing resources include The Big Chair (1950), the former City Hall (1938), the former Davidson County Office Building, the former United States Post Office (1926), (former) Davidson County Office Building (1957), the Dr. Orien R. Hodgin Dental Office, the North State Telephone Warehouse (c. 1940), First National Bank of Thomasville (1922), C. R. Thomas Block (c. 1900), and the Lambeth Furniture Company/Thomasville Chair Company.

It was added to the National Register of Historic Places in 2005.

References

Historic districts on the National Register of Historic Places in North Carolina
Italianate architecture in North Carolina
Neoclassical architecture in North Carolina
Buildings and structures in Davidson County, North Carolina
National Register of Historic Places in Davidson County, North Carolina